Nodwell may refer to:

 Bruce Nodwell (1914–2006), Canadian inventor and engineer
 Nodwell Peaks, Graham Land, Antarctic Peninsula, Antarctica
 Nodwell Indian Village; an archaeological site in Port Elgin, Ontario, Canada
 Nodwell tracked carrier, a caterpillar drive truck made by Robin-Nodwell Mfg. Ltd.; created by Bruce Nodwell
 Robin-Nodwell Mgf. Ltd.; makers of the Nodwell tracked carrier; a company founded by Bruce Nodwell
 Nodwell (UK), a British tractor company; see List of tractor manufacturers

See also

 Well (disambiguation)
 NOD (disambiguation)